Renate Da Rin (born 1962) is a journalist, editor and publisher from Cologne.

Da Rin received her M.A., having studied German Studies, Ethnology, Medieval and Modern Greek and Philosophy, at the University of Cologne. After spending four years in Greece and India (doing fieldwork/travelling) and several years working both as an editor in the development policy sector and as a literature editor, she became a self-employed author and editor in 1990. Since 1997 she has been the owner and manager of the text agency Da Rin.

In 2007 Renate Da Rin founded the publishing house buddy's knife jazzedition, which concentrates on publishing works by improvising musicians. So far it has published four books, three of them featuring texts by musicians from the New York downtown jazz scene. Authors include the bassists Henry Grimes and William Parker and the saxophonists Roy Nathanson and Noah Howard.

In March 2010 she published silent solos – improvisers speak. This anthology is the result of in-depth research by the publisher on the scene of improvising musicians based in New York. It presents texts by 50 high-carat, internationally renowned jazz musicians from the current avant-garde scene, including Leena Conquest, Cooper-Moore, Jayne Cortez, Charles Gayle, Gunter Hampel, Terry Jenoure, Oliver Lake, Yusef Lateef, Joёlle Léandre, David Liebmann, Sabir Mateen, Nicole Mitchell, William Parker, Matana Roberts, Larry Roland, Matthew Shipp, Warren Smith, Lisa Sokolov, David S. Ware, with an incisive foreword by George E. Lewis.
Plans for the future include part II of the anthology and further authorial literature.

In September 2011, the latest buddy's knife jazzedition book project music in my soul - the autobiography of the late alto saxophonist Noah Howard - was released.

In 2015 giving birth to sound - women in creative music was published by Renate Da Rin and William Parker as co-editors. giving birth to sound is a collection of contributions by 48 women musicians of the creative music scene, inter alia Jay Clayton, Marilyn Crispell, Claudine François, Terry Jenoure, Joëlle Léandre, Marilyn Mazur, Nicole Mitchell, Maggie Nicols, Angelika Niescier, Lisa Sokolov, Ijeoma Chinue Thomas, Fay Victor, Jessica Williams, etc.

References

External links
 Website of text agency Da Rin
 Website of buddy's knife jazzedition
 Roy Nathanson on myspace.com

Living people
1962 births
German journalists